Scirpophaga phaedima is a moth in the family Crambidae. It was described by Ian Francis Bell Common in 1960. It is found in northern Australia.

The wingspan is 22–40 mm. Both the forewings and hindwings are white.

References

Moths described in 1960
Schoenobiinae
Moths of Australia